Rapua is a monotypic genus of South Pacific intertidal spiders containing the single species, Rapua australis. It was first described by Raymond Robert Forster in 1970, and has only been found in New Zealand.

References

Desidae
Monotypic Araneomorphae genera
Spiders of New Zealand
Taxa named by Raymond Robert Forster